Eloise H. Christian (1890 - 1951) served in the California State Assembly for the 34th district from 1921 to 1925 and California State Senate for the 13th district from 1925 to 1933. During World War I he also served in the United States Army.

References

United States Army personnel of World War I
Republican Party California state senators
Republican Party members of the California State Assembly
1890 births
1951 deaths